Live at the Royal Albert Hall is a three-CD live album set by The Who, released in 2003.

Discs one and two were recorded on 27 November 2000 and consist of John Entwistle, Roger Daltrey, Pete Townshend, Zak Starkey, and John "Rabbit" Bundrick performing a concert at the Royal Albert Hall for the Teenage Cancer Trust along with several guests. Disc three features four songs from The Who's last concert with John Entwistle, from 8 February 2002. Townshend dedicated "Heart to Hang Onto" to the late Ronnie Lane. The concert was also released on DVD as The Who & Special Guests: Live at the Royal Albert Hall.

Track listing
All songs composed by Pete Townshend except where noted.

Disc one
"I Can't Explain" – 2:51
"Anyway, Anyhow, Anywhere" (Townshend, Roger Daltrey) – 4:33
"Pinball Wizard" – 3:44
"Relay" – 8:14
"My Wife" (John Entwistle) – 6:38
"The Kids Are Alright" – 6:12
"Mary Anne with the Shaky Hand" – 4:12
"Bargain" – 6:52
"Magic Bus"  (incl. "Country Line Special" by Cyril Davies) – 10:05
"Who Are You" – 7:05
"Baba O'Riley" – 5:48

Disc two
"Drowned" – 6:38
"Heart to Hang Onto" – 4:41
"So Sad About Us" – 3:19
"I'm One" (Featuring Eddie Vedder) – 2:51
"Getting in Tune" (Featuring Eddie Vedder) – 6:21
"Behind Blue Eyes" –(Featuring Bryan Adams) 3:48
"You Better You Bet" – 5:46
"The Real Me" – 5:27
"5:15" – 11:40
"Won't Get Fooled Again" – 9:12
"Substitute" – 3:20
"Let's See Action" – 5:15
"My Generation" – 5:30
"See Me, Feel Me/Listening to You" – 5:04

Disc three
"I'm Free" – 2:49
"I Don't Even Know Myself" – 4:43
"Summertime Blues" (Jerry Capehart, Eddie Cochran) – 3:20
"Young Man Blues" (Mose Allison) – 5:54

Personnel
The Who
Roger Daltrey – lead vocals, acoustic guitar
John Entwistle – bass guitar, vocals
Pete Townshend – lead guitar, acoustic guitar, vocals

Additional musicians
John "Rabbit" Bundrick – piano, keyboards, backing vocals
Zak Starkey – drums

Special Guests
Bryan Adams – vocals on "Behind Blue Eyes", "See Me, Feel Me/Listening to You"
Noel Gallagher – guitar and backing vocals on "Won't Get Fooled Again"
Kelly Jones – vocals and rhythm guitar on "Substitute"
Nigel Kennedy – violin on "Baba O'Riley"
Eddie Vedder – vocals on "I'm One", "Getting in Tune", "Let's See Action", and "See Me, Feel Me/Listening to You"
Paul Weller – vocals and acoustic guitar on "So Sad About Us"

Design
 Cover design by Richard Evans
 Photography by Ross Halfin

References

Live albums recorded at the Royal Albert Hall
The Who live albums
2003 live albums